HMS Newport was a member of the standardize 20-gun sixth rates built at the end of the 17th Century. She spent her short career sailing between New England and Home Waters. She was captured by French Warships in 1696.

Newport was the first named vessel in the Royal Navy.

Construction
She was ordered in the First Batch of four ships from Portsmouth Dockyard to be built under the guidance of their Master Shipwright, William Stigant. She was launched on 7 April 1694.

Commissioned Service
Commissioned on 22 January 1694 under the command of Captain Wentworth Paxton, RN, She sailed round trip New England returning to Home waters in 1694, 1695 and 1696. She did not return in 1696.

Disposition
HMS Newport was captured by French Warships in the Bay of Fundy on5 July 1696. She was incorporated into the French Navy as LeNieuport and remained in service until condemned in 1720.

Citations

References
 Winfield, British Warships in the Age of Sail (1603 – 1714), by Rif Winfield, published by Seaforth Publishing, England © 2009, EPUB , Chapter 6, The Sixth Rates, Vessels acquired from 18 December 1688, Sixth Rates of 20 guns and up to 26 guns, Maidstone Group, Newport
 Colledge, Ships of the Royal Navy, by J.J. Colledge, revised and updated by Lt Cdr Ben Warlow and Steve Bush, published by Seaforth Publishing, Barnsley, Great Britain, © 2020, e  (EPUB), Section N (Newport)

 

1690s ships
Corvettes of the Royal Navy
Naval ships of the United Kingdom